In lithic reduction, termination type is a characteristic indicating the manner in which the distal end of a lithic flake detaches from a core (Andrefsky 1998:18).  Common types include:

 Step/snap termination – these occur when a flake snaps or breaks during removal, resulting in an abrupt right-angle break.
 Hinge termination – results when the applied force rolls away from the core or objective piece, creating a rounded or blunted distal end.
 Overshot/outrepasse/plunging termination - occurs when the applied force dips and removes a section of the opposite margin of the artifact or the distal end of the core.  Also referred to as a reverse hinge termination.
 Perverse termination - "twisting" breaks resulting from when the applied force is redirected through the material in a helical fashion;
 Feather/monotomic termination – a smooth termination that results in a feathered distal end.  The distal ends of these flakes are only a few molecules thick, are extremely sharp, and indicate a flawless detachment.  These are the intended results of some lithic reduction techniques, and are very desirable for opportunistic tool use that does not require retouching or sharpening.

References
 Andrefsky, William, Jr. (1998) Lithics: Macroscopic approaches to analysis.  Cambridge University Press, Cambridge.

Lithics